A Year of the Quiet Sun is a 1984 Polish film written and directed by Krzysztof Zanussi and starring Maja Komorowska and Scott Wilson. It tells the story of a romance between a Polish woman and an American soldier in Poland, shortly after WWII.

The film was nominated for 1986's Golden Globe Award for Best Foreign Language Film. At the Venice Film Festival, the film was awarded the Golden Lion and Pasinetti Awards.

Cast
 Maja Komorowska as Emilia
 Scott Wilson as Norman
 Hanna Skarżanka as Emilia's Mother
 Ewa Dałkowska as Stella
 Vadim Glowna as Herman
 Daniel Webb as David
 Zbigniew Zapasiewicz as Szary
 Zofia Rysiówna as Interpreter
 Janusz Gajos as Moonlighter
 Jerzy Stuhr as Adzio
 Gustaw Lutkiewicz as Bakery Owner
 Marek Kondrat as Malutki
 Jerzy Nowak as English Doctor
 Lee Michael Walczuk as US Captain Michael

See also 
Cinema of Poland
List of Polish language films

References

External links

1984 films
1984 romantic drama films
Polish romantic drama films
Polish war drama films
West German films
1980s Polish-language films
1980s English-language films
English-language German films
English-language Polish films
Romantic period films
Films set in 1946
War romance films
Golden Lion winners
Films directed by Krzysztof Zanussi
Films scored by Wojciech Kilar
German war drama films
Polish World War II films
1984 multilingual films
Polish multilingual films
German multilingual films
1980s German films